Useful idiot is a political term for misguided supporters of a cause.

Useful Idiot or Useful Idiots may also refer to:

"Useful Idiot" (Homeland), an episode of the television series Homeland
Useful Idiots (podcast), a podcast hosted by Matt Taibbi and Katie Halper
"Useful Idiot", a song by band Tool from their 1996 album Ænima
Useful Idiots, a novel by Jan Mark
Useful Idiots: How Liberals Got It Wrong in the Cold War and Still Blame America First, a book by Mona Charen